Dirección Nacional de Inteligencia Estratégica Militar (National Directorate of Strategic Military Intelligence, DNIEM) is an Argentine intelligence agency part of the National Intelligence System, created by the 2001 Intelligence Reform Law 25.520. It is structurally dependent of the Ministry of Defense.

Director
The current director is Carlos Aníbal Aguilar, by decree D 1624/2005.

Function
Its main mission is to produce strategic military intelligence and analysis. The intelligence services of the Argentine Armed Forces (see this list) have the job of producing strategic operational and tactical intelligence for the planning and conduction of military operations as well as the national strategic intelligence plan.

See also
List of Secretaries of Intelligence
Argentine intelligence agencies
National Intelligence System
National Intelligence School
Directorate of Judicial Surveillance
National Directorate of Criminal Intelligence
Secretariat of Intelligence

External links
 Intelligence Reform Law 25.520
 Interior Security Law 24.059

Argentine intelligence agencies